Mahajeran or Mohajeran is a city in Hamadan Province, Iran. 

Mahajeran or Mohajeran  may also refer to:
 Mahajeran, Markazi
 Mahajeran-e Abu ol Hasan
 Mahajeran-e Kamar
 Mahajeran-e Khak
 Mohajeran Rural District, in Hamadan Province